Gladstone Robinson (24 January 1943 – 8 January 2010) was a Jamaican cricketer who played in three first-class matches between 1963 and 1965.

References

External links
 

1943 births
2010 deaths
Jamaican cricketers
Jamaica cricketers
Place of birth missing